Qazaxlı (also Gazakhly) is a village in the Dashkasan District of Azerbaijan. The village was founded in 1922 on the site of an abandoned ancient Armenian village and had an Armenian population before the exodus of Armenians from Azerbaijan after the outbreak of the Nagorno-Karabakh conflict.

Administration 
The village forms part of the municipality of Emirvar.

References

External links 

Populated places in Dashkasan District